The 1966 Kerry Senior Football Championship was the 66th staging of the Kerry Senior Football Championship since its establishment by the Kerry County Board in 1889.

East Kerry entered the championship as the defending champions.

The final was played on 2 November 1966 at Austin Stack Park in Tralee, between John Mitchels and East Kerry, in what was their first ever meeting in the final. John Mitchels won the match by 2-10 to 1-10 to claim their 10th championship title overall and a first title in three years. It remains their last championship title.

Results

Final

References

Kerry Senior Football Championship
1966 in Gaelic football